Lane Creek is a stream in the U.S. state of Oregon. It is a tributary to Willow Creek.

Lane Creek was named for a pioneer citizen named Lane who was killed near its course.

References

Rivers of Oregon
Rivers of Jackson County, Oregon